Pranab Rebatiranjan Dastidar (10 July 1933 – 11 February 2022) was an Indian electronics engineer and nuclear physicist. He was a director of Bhabha Atomic Research Center. Dastidar led the Electronic Detonation System in Smiling Buddha project, India's first ever nuclear bomb test. He received Padma Shri in 1975. He died at California on 11 February 2022.

References

1933 births
2022 deaths
Indian electronics engineers
Indian nuclear physicists